Bethesda Hospital may refer to:

 Bethesda Hospital (Ambur), Ambur, India
 Bethesda Hospital (North Hornell, New York), a twentieth-century hospital
Bethesda Hospital (Saint Paul, Minnesota), United States
 Bethesda Hospital (Yogyakarta), Indonesia
 Bethesda Naval Hospital, Maryland, United States
 Bethesda North Hospital, Montgomery, Ohio, United States

See also
Bethesda (disambiguation)